The third season of the American television sitcom The Nanny aired on CBS from September 11, 1995, to May 20, 1996. The series was created by actress Fran Drescher and her-then husband Peter Marc Jacobson, and developed by Prudence Fraser and Robert Sternin. Produced by Sternin and Fraser Ink Inc. (except for Oy to the World), Highschool Sweethearts (starting with Dope Diamond)  and TriStar Television, the series features Drescher, Jacobson, Fraser, Sternin, Caryn Lucas and Diane Wilk as executive producers.

Based on an idea inspired by Drescher's visit with a friend and The Sound of Music, the series revolves around Fran Fine, a Jewish woman from Flushing, Queens, New York, who is hired by a wealthy Broadway producer to be the nanny to his three children. Drescher stars as the titular character, Charles Shaughnessy as British-born producer Maxwell Sheffield, and the children – Maggie, Brighton and Grace – portrayed by Nicholle Tom, Benjamin Salisbury, and Madeline Zima. The series also features Daniel Davis as Niles, the family butler, and Lauren Lane as C.C. Babcock, Maxwell's associate in his production company who is smitten with him. Several recurring characters also played a role in the sitcoms plotlines, many of whom were related to Fran.

Cast and characters

Main
 Fran Drescher as Fran Fine
 Charles Shaughnessy as Maxwell Sheffield
 Daniel Davis as Niles
 Lauren Lane as Chastity Claire "C.C" Babcock
 Nicholle Tom as Maggie Sheffield
 Benjamin Salisbury as Brighton Sheffield
 Madeline Zima as Grace Sheffield

Recurring
 Renée Taylor as Sylvia Fine
 Rachel Chagall as Val Toriello
 Ann Morgan Guilbert as Yetta Rosenberg

Special guest stars
 Donald Trump as himself
 Florence Griffith Joyner as herself
 Alex Trebek as himself
 Roger Clinton Jr. as himself
 Lainie Kazan as Aunt Freida
 David L. Lander as the Landlord
 Catherine Oxenberg as Sydney Mercer
 Milton Berle as Uncle Manny
 Dina Merrill as Elizabeth Sheffield
 Virginia Graham as herself
 Todd Oldham as himself
 John Astin as Dr. Roberts
 Elizabeth Taylor as herself
 Rosie O'Donnell as Cozette
 Joyce Brothers as Dr. Joyce Brothers
 Monica Seles as herself
 Burt Bacharach as himself
 Harry Van Gorkum as Nigel Sheffield
 Eartha Kitt as herself

Guest stars
 Michael McKean as Professor Noel Babcock PhD
 Ian Buchanan as Jules Kimball
 Kane Picoy as Jeff
 Allan Rich as The Judge
 Donna Dixon as Monica Baker
 Lorna Luft as Cousin Susan Rosenberg
 Zack Norman as Uncle Jack Rosenberg
 Mort Drescher as Uncle Stanley
 Burke Moses as Tony Tatorri
 Pamela Hayden as Chester the Dog (voice)
 Marilyn Cooper as Grandma Nettie
 James DiStefano as Pauly
 Marvin Hamlisch as Alan Neider
 Michael Bacall as Tommy Altman
 John Bishop as Shoe Salesman
 Anthony Addabbo as Mike LaVoe
 Paolo Seganti as Philippe
 David Starzyk as Steve Goodman
 Tim Bagley as Flight Attendant

Episodes

References

External links
 

1995 American television seasons
1996 American television seasons
The Nanny